The 2015 Lecoq Seoul Open was a professional tennis tournament played on outdoor hard courts. It was the second edition of the tournament for women and the first edition for men. It was part of the 2015 ATP Challenger Tour and the 2015 ITF Women's Circuit, offering a total of $50,000 in prize money. It took place in Seoul, South Korea, on 11–17 May 2015 for men and 18–24 May 2015 women.

Men's singles main draw entrants

Seeds 

 1 Rankings as of 4 May 2015

Other entrants 
The following players received wildcards into the singles main draw:
  Lee Duck-hee
  Nam Ji-sung
  Kwon Soon-woo

The following players received entry from the qualifying draw:
  Matthew Barton
  Marcos Giron
  Dimitar Kutrovsky
  Fritz Wolmarans

The following players received entry by lucky loser spots:
  Philip Bester
  Li Zhe
  Wu Di

The following player received entry by a special exempt:
  Grega Žemlja

Women's singles main draw entrants

Seeds 

 1 Rankings as of 11 May 2015

Other entrants 
The following players received wildcards into the singles main draw:
  Ahn Yu-jin
  Hong Seung-yeon
  Kim Sun-jung
  Lee So-ra

The following players received entry from the qualifying draw:
  Han Sung-hee
  Kang Seo-kyung
  Mari Osaka
  Yurika Sema

Champions

Men's singles

 Go Soeda def.  Chung Hyeon, 3–6, 6–3, 6–3

Women's singles

 Riko Sawayanagi def.  Jang Su-jeong, 6–4, 6–4

Men's doubles

 Gong Maoxin  /  Peng Hsien-yin def.  Lee Hyung-taik /  Danai Udomchoke, 6–4, 7–5

Women's doubles

 Chan Chin-wei /  Lee Ya-hsuan def.  Hong Seung-yeon /  Kang Seo-kyung, 6–2, 6–1

External links 
 2015 Lecoq Seoul Open at ITFtennis.com

2015 ITF Women's Circuit
2015 ATP Challenger Tour
2015
2015
2015 in South Korean tennis
Seoul Open Challenger